The Canon de 75 Montagne modèle 1928 (75 mm M mle.28) was a French mountain gun, used by France, Poland and Nazi Germany during World War II.

History 
It is a derivative of the Canon de 75 M(montagne) modele 1919 Schneider, upgraded based on feedback from the Rif War. According to Peter Chamberlain, the design of the mle 1928 "owed little to that of the mle 1919" while the French Army manuals insisted on it being "slightly modified". The mle 1928 featured a simpler shield.

The mle 1928 fired the same ammunitions than the Canon de 75 modèle 1897 and the mle. 1919. It could be carried on seven mules or towed by three mules.

The guns were also sold to Poland. After 1940, these weapons were used by the Germans as 7.5 cm GebK 283(f). The French used this weapon to equip the artillery batteries of the 4th Moroccan Mountain Division during 1944 and 1945. Some were later sent to alpine units but the gun was considered obsolete by that date.

See also
 List of mountain artillery

Notes

 

World War II mountain artillery
World War II weapons of France
Artillery of France
75 mm artillery
Military equipment introduced in the 1920s